João Maurício (Rio de Janeiro, 1973 – Armação dos Búzios, 5 May 2020), known as João Kabeção, was a Brazilian skateboarder.

Career 

In the 1980s and early 1990s, Kabeção was among the most famous skateboarders in Brazil, mainly known for his sessions at the Urquinha mini-track, in the South Zone of Rio de Janeiro.

In 1989, he won a stage of the professional Brazilian Skate Circuit as an amateur skateboarder, being the first to achieve this feat. The victory in this event earned him the cover of the magazine SKT News, the opportunity to launch a pro-model and the invitation to participate in the 1990 Itaú Skate Cup, an event on the beach of Ipanema that featured the participation of Mark Gonzales among its highlights.

Shortly thereafter, however, he stopped skating and retired from the public scene. He lived the last years of his life in the city of Búzios, where he worked as a teacher of jiu-jitsu.

Death 

Kabeção died on 5 May 2020, aged 47, of COVID-19, during the pandemic in Brazil.

References

Brazilian skateboarders
People from Rio de Janeiro (city)
1973 births
2020 deaths
Deaths from the COVID-19 pandemic in Rio de Janeiro (state)